Catoptria hilarellus is a moth in the family Crambidae. It was described by Aristide Caradja in 1925. It is found in Taurus Mountains of Turkey.

References

Crambini
Moths described in 1925
Moths of Asia

Insects of Turkey